Culann's Hounds are a traditional Irish folk band from San Francisco, California, United States. Founded in 1999 by Steve Gardner and Michael Kelleher as The Irish Bastards, the band began playing gigs and soon adopted the more broadly appealing name.

Origins
The name Culann's Hounds derives from the Irish folk story of Cuchulainn, a great Irish hero chronicled in the Tain. Cuchulainn, meaning the Hound of Culann, earned his name after killing (in self-defense) a fierce guard dog owned by the blacksmith Culann. The boy repaid the smith by guarding his house until a new dog could be raised.

Culann's Hounds played their first public gig in spring of 1999 at the Blackthorn Tavern in San Francisco. Though initially sparsely attended, the up-tempo music attracted a crowd, establishing a tradition of Sunday afternoon gigs, sometimes called the Hounds' Sunday Beer Social. Culann's Hounds' popularity grew and in 2001 they recorded and released their first, eponymously titled album. Their second album, Year of the Dog,  was released March 17, 2006 (St. Patrick's Day) at the Great American Music Hall. The Hounds headlined the show; Quin and the Earl Brothers opened. The Hounds have returned to headline the Great American Music hall for St. Patrick's Day each year from 2007 to the present.  

The Hounds have toured in the United States and Europe, playing concerts and festivals with numerous top shelf acts from various genres, and every Irish band of note. 

The Hounds are preparing material for a new album, which will feature more of their original compositions. Some of these tracks were released in 2007 (The House of Faith Session) and 2008 (One for the Road), though the latter is composed almost entirely of traditional songs.

Members
Current line-up:
 Steve Gardner - Violin|Fiddle, Guitar, Mandolin, Vocals
 Michael Kelleher - Guitar, Tin whistle, Vocals
 Renée de la Prade - Button Accordion, Vocals
 Dan Duffin - Bass Guitar, Vocals 
 Scott Marshall - Bodhrán, Drums & Percussion, Vocals

Past members:
 Michael Messer - Drums
 Chris Thomas - Drums
 Adam Roach - Guitar
 Caitlin Oliver-Gans - Bass
 Alan Kaufman - Vocals
 Frank Jordan, Jr. - Bodhrán, Vocals
 Conall O'Raghallaigh - Uilleann pipes
 Kevin McDonough - Tin whistle, Flute
 Eliza James - Vocals
 Tim Hill - Uilleann pipes
 Jonathon Tait - Bodhrán

Discography
Culann's Hounds (2001)
Old Hag You've Killed Me/The Tar Road to Sligo/The Gander in the Hole
Lady's Fancy
The Maids of Mitchelstown
Spancil Hill
Banish Misfortune/O'Keefe's Slide/The Monk's Jig
Peggy Gordon
The Swallowtail Jig/Ballinasloe Fair/Cherish the Ladies
The Black Velvet Band
The Wind that Shakes the Barley/The Musical Priest/Farewell to Erin

Year of the Dog (2006)
Twin Peaks
Dirty Old Town
Rainy Day
The Foggy Dew
The Skylark
Pelican Inn
Wild Mountain Thyme
Homeward Bound
Éire
The Carlow Set
The Tennessee Waltz
Helvic Head

The House of Faith Session (2007)
Bourbon and Toulouse
Thousand Flowers
Zombie
Shilelagh Polka

One for the Road (2008)
The Rising of the Moon
Irish Rover
The Wet Goat (Whelan's Jig/Lantern Jig/Kid on the Mountain/An Phis Fhiliuch)
Old Triangle
Whiskey in the Jar
Danny Boy
The Blackthorn Tavern (Tempest/Drag Her Around the Road/Ormond Sound/Virginia Reel)
Wild Rover
Three Drunken Polkas (I Have a Bonnet Trimmed with Blue/Little House in the Glen/Tom Billy's)
Star of the County Down
She Moved Through the Fair
Rocky Road to Dublin
Parting Glass
Lettuce Leaf
A Nation Once Again

References
"San Francisco Accordion Festival" by K. Tighe, The San Francisco Bay Guardian, May 31 - June 6, 2006; Vol. 40, No. 35, retrieved June 2, 2006

External links
 Culann's Hounds Official Site
 
 Traditional album: One For The Road

Musical groups from San Francisco
Celtic music groups